Antonio Lamar Hayes (born December 9, 1977) is an American politician who represents the 40th legislative district of Baltimore in the Maryland Senate. He previously represented the 40th district in the Maryland House of Delegates from 2015 to 2019.

Background 

Hayes was born in Baltimore, Maryland. He was raised by his grandmother and grew up in Baltimore. He attended Frostburg State University, earning a Bachelor of Science degree in political science in 2000.

Since 2010, Hayes has served as the Chief of Staff of the Baltimore City Department of Social Services.

In the legislature 
In 2014, Hayes defeated two-term incumbent Shawn Z. Tarrant to win a seat in the House of Delegates. He was sworn in on January 14, 2015.

On July 29, 2017, Hayes announced his bid for State Senate, challenging appointed state Senator Barbara A. Robinson for the seat formerly held by Mayor Catherine Pugh. He defeated Robinson in the Democratic primary, earning 65.4 percent of the vote. He ultimately won the general election unchallenged and took office on January 9, 2019.

Following the death of U.S. Representative Elijah Cummings in October 2019, Hayes was seen as a possible candidate in the subsequent special election. Later that month, he said that he would not run for the seat.

In 2020, Hayes ran for national delegate pledged to Joe Biden in Maryland's 7th congressional district at the Democratic National Convention. He won the primary election, receiving 18.4 percent of the vote.

Committee assignments
 Member, Finance Committee, 2019–present (energy & public utilities subcommittee, 2019–present)
 Member, Joint Committee on Federal Relations, 2019–present
 Senate Chair, Joint Committee on Behavioral Health and Opioid Use Disorders, 2019–present
 Member, Joint Committee on Administrative, Executive and Legislative Review, 2020–present
 Member, Executive Nominations Committee, 2021–present
 Member, Health and Government Operations Committee, 2015–2019 (government operations & long-term care subcommittee, 2015–2017; health facilities & occupations subcommittee, 2015–2017; government operations & estates & trusts subcommittee, 2017–2019; health facilities & pharmaceuticals subcommittee, 2017–2019)
 Member, Joint Committee on Children, Youth, and Families, 2015–2019
 Member, Public Safety and Policing Work Group, 2015–2016
 Member, Affordable Care Act Work Group, 2018
 Member, Opioid Work Group, 2018

Other memberships
 Chair, Baltimore City Senate Delegation, 2019–2020
 Member, Legislative Black Caucus of Maryland, 2015–present
 Vice-Chair, Democratic Party Caucus, 2020–present

Political positions

Paid family leave 
During the 2020 legislative session, Hayes introduced the "Time to Care Act", a bill that would provide Maryland workers with up to 12 weeks of paid family leave. The bill was reintroduced in 2021 and 2022, during which it passed and became law after the General Assembly voted to override Governor Larry Hogan's veto.

Statewide politics 
In September 2021, Hayes endorsed author Wes Moore for Governor of Maryland in the 2022 Maryland gubernatorial election.

Electoral history

References 

Democratic Party members of the Maryland House of Delegates
African-American state legislators in Maryland
Politicians from Baltimore
1977 births
Living people
Frostburg State University alumni
21st-century American politicians
Democratic Party Maryland state senators
21st-century African-American politicians
20th-century African-American people